Gerald Paul Alexander (born March 26, 1968) is an American former Major League Baseball pitcher.

External links

1968 births
Living people
Baseball players from Baton Rouge, Louisiana
Major League Baseball pitchers
Texas Rangers players
Gulf Coast Rangers players
Charlotte Rangers players
Oklahoma City 89ers players
Canton-Akron Indians players
Tulane Green Wave baseball players